Palimbang, officially the Municipality of Palimbang (Jawi: ايڠايد نو ڤاليمبڠ), is a 2nd class municipality in the province of Sultan Kudarat, Philippines. According to the 2020 census, it has a population of 92,828 people.

It was incorporated on August 14, 1959, through Executive Order No. 350 by President Carlos P. Garcia.

Their annual feast named Kalilang sa Biwang is celebrated every 11 November.

History
In the early days of the coming of Shariff Kabunsuan in Mindanao, Palimbang was not yet a dot on any geographical map of the island. This place was a mere abode of the primitive people whom we call not the cultural minority or highlander.

According to Tarsila, there was a tremendous change in the society due to the spread out of Islam in the coastal areas widely known as Biwang, which later paved a way toward Islamic Civilization of the inhabitants. Palimbang at that time was locally known as Pula a tree widely grown in the place. A group of fishermen from Palimbang, Indonesia was lifted by strong winds and accidentally docked at the mouth of Pula River. They were warmly welcomed by the native datus headed by Sondalo Tambuto. The hospitality shown to them reigned in their hearts and drawn the visitors to settle and intermarry with the native Muslims. A new community was developed and later named Palimbang, in honor of the fishermen's hometown, which now remained the name of the municipality.

Attempts to create Palimbang into municipality was thrice first, by the energetic leadership of Dr. Julio Sarayba in the 1940s; second, on July 24, 1953, by the seventeen influential leaders of PAT-A-INGED (four communities) (1) Kraan, (2) Kanipaan, (3) Pula and (4) Maganao, namely: Dr. Julio Sarayba, chairman; Sixto Quijano, Vice Chairman; Mr. Remegio Managad, Mr. Pedro Mamon, Mr. Pedro Bonifacio, Mr. Cresencio Geneza, Mr. Felipe Tunngala, Datu Pasay Ayao, Datu Manti Pangansayan, Mr. Lomontod Latip, Datu Talicop Lidasan, Datu Sundalo Tambuto, Haji Salik Manan, Hadji Druz Ali, Mr. Cecilio Domingo, Mr. Gorgonio Bagang, Mr. Dominador Durendez and Datu Sumana Sulog, members. Others are Datu Padasan Macut, Datu Obpon Dipatuan, Datu Pelangking Bayang and Mr. Dominador Garcia. It was a blast to the petitioners as they were regarded mentally unable to run their own government and the income of the barrios in the coastal portion was insufficient to meet the requisite of creating a new municipality. Third, by the same petitioner who collectively agreed to support candidates that will ascertain a seat of government in Palimbang in case they get elected. Fortunately, the well-supported Datu Udtog Matalam faction won. Subsequently, headed by the Provincial Governor of Cotabato Datu Udtog Matalam, the Provincial Governor of Cotabato recommended by the Members of the Board, sponsored by Congressman Salipada K. Pendatun, and supported by Datu Guiwan Mastura and Kiamba Mayor Cornelio Falgui, Palimbang was proclaimed municipality on August 14, 1959, by virtue of Executive Order No. 350, pursuant to Section 68 Revised Administrative Code, issued by President Carlos P. Garcia.

From its creation up to the present, Palimbang was served by twelve generations of municipal officials.

In spite of the exceptional development potentials of Palimbang, the municipality is somehow left in terms of physical development. The municipal government is exploring strategies and pouring its meager resources to meet and welcome new challenges. With the private sector at the helm of its economy, coupled with its supportive citizenry and strong political leadership committed to the full development of its human and natural resources, the municipality will certainly make its vision for development.

Palimbang was organized into a municipality through Executive Order No. 350, issued by President Carlos P. Garcia on August 14, 1959. It consists of forty-six barrios of Lebak and Kiamba, both then part of the old Cotabato province. Upon the division of the province in 1973 through Marcos' Presidential Decree No. 341, the municipality became part of newly-created province of Sultan Kudarat.

Malisbong Massacre

The Malisbong Masjid massacre, also called the Palimbang massacre, was the mass murder of Moros on September 24, 1974, in the coastal village of Malisbong in Palimbang, Sultan Kudarat, Mindanao where units of Gov. Siongco and the Philippine Army killed more than 1,000. Accounts compiled by the Moro Women's Center in General Santos City state that 1,500 male Moros aged 11–70 were killed inside a mosque, 3,000 women and children aged 9–60 were detained - with the women being raped and that 300 houses were razed by the government forces. The massacre occurred two years after Ferdinand Marcos declared martial law in September 1972.

The massacre started after the first four days on the feast of Ramadan when members of the Philippine Constabulary arrived and captured barangay officials along with 1,000 other Muslims and never came back. For more than a month, the military would capture murder residents in the area by batch. Testimonies show that victims were made to strip of their clothes, dig their own graves and shot.

Geography

Barangays
Palimbang is politically subdivided into 40 barangays.

Climate

Demographics

Government

References

External links
Palimbang Profile at PhilAtlas.com
Palimbang Profile at the DTI Cities and Municipalities Competitive Index
[ Philippine Standard Geographic Code]
Philippine Census Information
Local Governance Performance Management System

Municipalities of Sultan Kudarat
Establishments by Philippine executive order